Pozanicline (INN, codenamed ABT-089) is a drug developed by Abbott, that has nootropic and neuroprotective effects. Animal studies suggested it useful for the treatment of ADHD and subsequent human trials have shown ABT-089 to be effective for this application. It binds with high affinity subtype-selective to the α4β2 nicotinic acetylcholine receptors and has partial agonism to the α6β2 subtype, but not the α7 and α3β4 subtypes familiar to nicotine. It has particularly low tendency to cause side effects compared to other drugs in the class, making it an exciting candidate for clinical development.

Synthesis
Pozanicline is synthesized from 2-methyl-3-hydroxypyridine and Boc-L-Prolinol through a dehydration reaction followed by deprotection of the nitrogen atom of prolinol

References 

Nicotinic agonists
Nootropics
Phenol ethers
Pyridines
Pyrrolidines
Stimulants